The Swedish Cyprus Expedition was a project to systematically investigate the archaeology of the early history of Cyprus. It took place between September 1927 and March 1931 and was led by three archaeologists: Einar Gjerstad, Erik Sjöqvist and Alfred Westholm together with architect John Lindros.

Archaeological excavations were made at various locations in Cyprus including Lapithos, Nitovikla, Agia Eirini, Marion, Idalion, Amathus and Enkomi. The results were published in four volumes from 1934 to 1972. Most of the finds are now kept at the Cyprus Museum in Nicosia and Medelhavsmuseet in Stockholm.

In total, 30 sites and 375 graves were excavated. The Expedition's Cypriotic driver and assistant, Tooulis Souidos, followed the expedition to Sweden where he continued to work with the Cyprus collections.

See also
Kition
600 photos from the SCE Archives uploaded here - https://commons.wikimedia.org/wiki/Category:Media_contributed_by_SMVK_2017-02
SCE Volumes  uploaded here - https://archive.org/search.php?query=Swedish%20Cyprus%20Expedition

References

Sources
Fischer, P.M. The New Swedish Cyprus Expedition 2010. Excavations at Dromolaxia Vizatzia/Hala Sultan Tekke. Preliminary results. With appendices by P. Klingborg, F. and F. Kärfve, C. Hagberg, O. Svensson, S. Macheridis and L. Franz. OpAthRom (Opuscula) 4, 2011, 69-89. https://doi.org/10.30549/opathrom-04-04

Fischer, P.M. The New Swedish Cyprus Expedition 2011: Excavations at Dromolaxia Vizatzia / Hala Sultan Tekke. Preliminary results. OpAthRom (Opuscula) 5, 2012. https://doi.org/10.30549/opathrom-05-04

Rita C. Severis, The Swedes in Cyprus, Texts and studies in the history of Cyprus, Cyprus Research Centre, 2008.

Winbladh, M.-L., Cypriote Antiquities in the Medelhavsmuseet, Stockholm 1977

Winbladh, M.-L., The Cyprus Collections in Medelhavsmuseet, Stockholm 1994.

Winbladh, M.-L., Kıbrıs Macerası – The Cyprus Adventure – Περιπετεια στην Κυπρο  (1927 - 1931), Galeri Kültür Kitabevi, Lefkoşa 2013

Winbladh, M-L., 'Adventuring with Cyprus. A Chronicle of the Swedish Cyprus Expedition 1927 – 1931' in The Northern Face of Cyprus. New Studies in Cypriot Archaeology and Art History, eds. Hazar Kaba & Summerer, Latife,  Istanbul 2016

Winbladh, M-L., Adventures of an archaeologist. Memoirs of a museum curator, AKAKIA Publications, London 2020

Archaeology of Cyprus
Cyprus–Sweden relations
Archaeological expeditions